The Congressional Black Caucus (CBC) is a caucus made up of mostly African-American members of the United States Congress. Representative Joyce Beatty from Ohio chaired the caucus from 2021 to 2023; she was succeeded by Representative Steven Horsford from Nevada as chair.

History

Founding
The predecessor to the caucus was founded in January 1969 as the Democratic Select Committee by a group of black members of the House of Representatives, including Shirley Chisholm of New York, Louis Stokes of Ohio and William L. Clay of Missouri. Black representatives had begun to enter the House in increasing numbers during the 1960s, and they had a desire for a formal organization. Further, Congressional redistricting and other factors in the wake of the Civil Rights Movement resulted in the number of black Congressmembers increasing from nine to thirteen. The first chairman, Charles Diggs, served from 1969 to 1971.

This organization was renamed the Congressional Black Caucus in February 1971 on the motion of Charles B. Rangel of New York. The thirteen founding members of the caucus were Shirley Chisholm, Bill Clay, George W. Collins, John Conyers, Ron Dellums, Charles Diggs, Augustus F. Hawkins, Ralph Metcalfe, Parren Mitchell, Robert N.C. Nix Sr., Charles Rangel, Louis Stokes, and Washington, D.C,. delegate Walter E. Fauntroy. Chisholm referred to the group as "unbought and unbossed". Five founding members of the CBC were also members of Prince Hall Freemasonry, an African-American branch of Freemasonry that became involved in civil rights: Stokes, Conyers, Rangel, Hawkins and Metcalfe.

President Richard Nixon refused to meet with the newly formed group, and so the CBC chose to boycott the 1971 State of the Union address, leading to their first joint press coverage. On March 25, 1971, Nixon finally met with the CBC, who presented him with a 32-page document including "recommendations to eradicate racism, provide quality housing for black families, and promote the full engagement of blacks in government". All the members of the caucus were included on the master list of Nixon political opponents.

On June 5, 1972, shortly before the 1972 Democratic National Convention would nominate George McGovern for president, the CBC wrote and released two documents: the Black Declaration of Independence and the Black Bill of Rights. Louis Stokes read a preamble and both documents into the record of the House of Representatives. The Black Bill of Rights includes sections on jobs and the economy, foreign policy, education, housing, public health, minority enterprise, drugs, prison reform, black representation in government, civil rights, voting rights in the District of Columbia, and the military. These documents were inspired by the National Black Political Convention and its own manifesto, The Gary Declaration: Black Politics at the Crossroads (also called the Black Agenda).

TransAfrica and Free South Africa Movement

In 1977, the organization was involved in the founding of TransAfrica, an education and advocacy affiliate that was formed to act as a resource on information on the African continent and its Diaspora. They worked closely with this organization to start the national anti-apartheid movement in the US, Free South Africa Movement (characterized by sit-ins, student protests, it became the longest lasting civil disobedience movement in U.S history) and to devise the legislative strategy for the Comprehensive Anti-Apartheid Act of 1986 that was subsequently passed over Ronald Reagan's veto. The organization continues to be active today and works on other campaigns.

Funding
In late 1994, after Republicans attained a majority in the House, the House passed House Resolution 6 on January 4, 1995, which prohibited “the establishment or continuation of any legislative service organization..." This decision was aimed at 28 organizations, which received taxpayer funding and occupied offices at the Capitol, including the CBC. Then-chairman Kweisi Mfume protested the decision. The CBC reconstituted as a Congressional Member Organization.

Events
The caucus is sometimes invited to the White House to meet with the president. It requests such a meeting at the beginning of each Congress.

During the 2020 George Floyd protests, the CBC provided House members with stoles made from kente to be worn for an 8:46-long moment of silence before introducing the Justice in Policing Act of 2020.

Goals
The caucus describes its goals as "positively influencing the course of events pertinent to African Americans and others of similar experience and situation", and "achieving greater equity for persons of African descent in the design and content of domestic and international programs and services."

The CBC encapsulates these goals in the following priorities: closing the achievement and opportunity gaps in education, assuring quality health care for every American, focusing on employment and economic security, ensuring justice for all, retirement security for all Americans, increasing welfare funds, and increasing equity in foreign policy.

Representative Eddie Bernice Johnson (D–TX), has said:

The Congressional Black Caucus is one of the world's most esteemed bodies, with a history of positive activism unparalleled in our nation's history. Whether the issue is popular or unpopular, simple or complex, the CBC has fought for thirty years to protect the fundamentals of democracy. Its impact is recognized throughout the world. The Congressional Black Caucus is probably the closest group of legislators on the Hill. We work together almost incessantly, we are friends and, more importantly, a family of freedom fighters. Our diversity makes us stronger, and the expertise of all of our members has helped us be effective beyond our numbers.

Mark Anthony Neal, a professor of African-American studies and popular culture at Duke University, wrote a column in late 2008 that the Congressional Black Caucus and other African-American-centered organizations are still needed, and should take advantage of "the political will that Obama's campaign has generated."

Congressional Black Caucus PAC
The Congressional Black Caucus PAC is a political action committee founded as a political arm of the caucus, aiming "to increase the number of Black Members of the US Congress...support Non-Black Candidates who will champion the needs and interests of the Black Community" and increase the "participation of Black Americans in the political process". Gregory Meeks (D-NY-5) chairs the PAC. The CBCPAC is known for its moderate-lean. The PAC caused controversy when it backed incumbent Michael Capuano, a white man, over challenger Ayanna Pressley, a black woman who ultimately defeated him. Two years later, it backed Eliot Engel, a white incumbent, over Jamaal Bowman, a black challenger who went on to defeat him.

HuffPost reporters questioned how endorsements were made, noting that the executive board included corporate lobbyists over CBC members. Representative Brenda Lawrence (D-MI-14) criticized the PAC's endorsement policies in 2020 and called for it to be reevaluated. Color of Change, a civil rights advocacy nonprofit group, released a letter in 2016 calling on the CBCPAC to cut ties with lobbyists from industries that are "notorious for the mistreatment and exploitation of Black people" including private prisons, pharmaceutical companies, student loan creditors, and big tobacco.

Membership 

The caucus has grown steadily as more black members have been elected. At its formal founding in 1971, the caucus had thirteen members. As of 2023, it had 55 members, including two who are non-voting members of the House, representing the District of Columbia and the U.S. Virgin Islands.

Senate members
As of 2021, there have been nine black senators since the caucus's founding. The seven black U.S. senators, all Democrats, who are or have been members of the Congressional Black Caucus are Senator Cory Booker of New Jersey, elected in 2013 (currently serving), Senator Raphael Warnock of Georgia, elected in 2021 (currently serving), and Senator Kamala Harris of California, elected in 2016, who resigned in 2021 to take on the Vice Presidency; former senators Carol Moseley Braun (1993–1999), Barack Obama (2005–2008), and Roland Burris (2008–2010), all of Illinois; and former senator Mo Cowan (2013) of Massachusetts.

Burris was appointed by Illinois governor Rod Blagojevich in December 2008 to fill Obama's seat for the remaining two years of his Senate term after Obama was elected president of the United States. Cowan was appointed to temporarily serve until a special election after John Kerry vacated his Senate seat to become U.S. secretary of state.

Senator Edward Brooke, a Republican who represented Massachusetts in the 1960s and 1970s, was not a member of the CBC. In 2013, Senator Tim Scott, Republican of South Carolina, also chose not to join the CBC after being appointed to fill Jim DeMint's Senate seat.

Black Republicans in the CBC
The caucus is officially non-partisan; but, in practice, the vast majority of African Americans elected to Congress since the CBC's founding have been Democrats. Twelve African American Republicans have been elected to Congress since the caucus was founded in 1971: 
 Senator Edward Brooke of Massachusetts (1967–1979)
 Delegate Melvin H. Evans of the Virgin Islands (1979–1981)
 Representative Gary Franks of Connecticut (1991–1997)
 Representative J. C. Watts of Oklahoma (1995–2003)
 Representative Allen West of Florida (2011–2013)
 Senator & Representative Tim Scott of South Carolina (2011–present)
 Representative Will Hurd of Texas (2015–2021)
 Representative Mia Love of Utah (2015–2019)
 Representative Byron Donalds of Florida (2021–present)
 Representative Burgess Owens of Utah (2021–present)
 Representative Wesley Hunt of Texas (2023–present)
 Representative John James of Michigan (2023–present)

Of these twelve, only Evans, Franks, West, and Love joined the CBC; currently, the caucus includes no Republicans.

Edward Brooke was the only serving African American U.S. senator when the CBC was founded in 1971, but he never joined the group and often clashed with its leaders. In 1979 Melvin H. Evans, a non-voting delegate from the Virgin Islands, became the first Republican member in the group's history. Gary Franks was the first Republican voting congressman to join in 1991, though he was at times excluded from CBC strategy sessions, skipped meetings, and threatened to quit the caucus.

J. C. Watts did not join the CBC when he entered Congress in 1995, and after Franks left Congress in 1997, no Republicans joined the CBC for fourteen years until Allen West joined the caucus in 2011, though fellow freshman congressman Tim Scott declined to join. After West was defeated for re-election, the CBC became a Democrat-only caucus once again in 2013.

In 2014, two black Republicans were elected to the House. Upon taking office, Will Hurd from Texas declined to join the caucus, while Mia Love from Utah, the first black Republican congresswoman, joined.

In 2021, newly elected black Republican Byron Donalds was blocked from joining the CBC.

Non-black membership 
All past and present members of the caucus have been African-American. In 2006, while running for Congress in a Tennessee district which is 60% black, Steve Cohen, who is Jewish, pledged to apply for membership in order to represent his constituents. However, after his election, his application was refused. Although the bylaws of the caucus do not make race a prerequisite for membership, former and current members of the caucus agreed that the group should remain "exclusively black". In response to the decision, Cohen referred to his campaign promise as "a social faux pas" because "It's their caucus and they do things their way. You don't force your way in. You need to be invited."

Representative Lacy Clay, a Democrat from Missouri and the son of Representative Bill Clay, a co-founder of the caucus, said: "Mr. Cohen asked for admission, and he got his answer. He is white and the caucus is black. It is time to move on. We have racial policies to pursue and we are pursuing them, as Mr. Cohen has learned. It is an unwritten rule. It is understood." Clay also issued the following statement:

Quite simply, Representative Cohen will have to accept what the rest of the country will have to accept—there has been an unofficial Congressional White Caucus for over 200 years, and now it is our turn to say who can join 'the club.' He does not, and cannot, meet the membership criteria unless he can change his skin color. Primarily, we are concerned with the needs and concerns of the black population, and we will not allow white America to infringe on those objectives.

Later the same week, Representative Tom Tancredo, a Republican from Colorado, objected to the continued existence of the CBC as well as the Democratic Congressional Hispanic Caucus and the Republican Congressional Hispanic Conference arguing that "It is utterly hypocritical for Congress to extol the virtues of a color-blind society while officially sanctioning caucuses that are based solely on race. If we are serious about achieving the goal of a colorblind society, Congress should lead by example and end these divisive, race-based caucuses."

Black Latino membership
Prior to 2017, no one had attempted to be in both the CBC and the Congressional Hispanic Caucus (CHC). In the 2016 House elections, Afro-Dominican State Senator Adriano Espaillat was elected to an open seat after twice trying to unseat CBC founder Charlie Rangel (who also has Puerto Rican ancestry) in the Democratic primary. Espaillat signaled that he wanted to join the CBC as well as the CHC, but it was reported that he was rebuffed, and it was insinuated that the cause was bad blood over the attempted primary challenges of Rangel.

In the 2018 elections, Afro-Latino Democrat Antonio Delgado was elected and joined the CBC, making no public effort to join the CHC as well. In the 2020 elections, Afro-Puerto Rican Democratic candidate Ritchie Torres published an Op-ed claiming that he was prevented from joining both the CBC and CHC as he wished to do, a claim which was denied by then-CBC chair Karen Bass. After being elected to Congress, Torres successfully joined both the CBC and CHC.

Chairs
The following U.S. representatives have chaired the Congressional Black Caucus:

Leadership 

Chair: Steven Horsford (NV-4, D)
First vice-chair: Yvette Clarke (NY-9, D)
Second vice-chair: Troy Carter (LA-2, D)
Whip: Marilyn Strickland (WA-10, D)
Secretary: Lucy McBath (GA-7, D)

Current members

United States Senate 
Georgia

 Raphael Warnock (D-GA)

New Jersey

 Cory Booker (D-NJ)

United States House of Representatives 
Alabama
 Terri Sewell  (D-AL-7, Birmingham)

California
 Barbara Lee (D-CA-12, Oakland)
 Sydney Kamlager-Dove (D-CA-37, Los Angeles)
 Maxine Waters (D-CA-43, Los Angeles)

Colorado
 Joe Neguse (D-CO-2, Lafayette)

Connecticut
 Jahana Hayes (D-CT-5, Wolcott)

Delaware
 Lisa Blunt Rochester (D-DE-AL, Wilmington)

District of Columbia
 Eleanor Holmes Norton (D-DC-AL, Washington)

Florida
 Maxwell Frost (D-FL-10, Orlando)
 Sheila Cherfilus-McCormick (D-FL-20, Miramar)
 Frederica Wilson (D-FL-24, Miami Gardens)

Georgia
 Sanford Bishop (D-GA-2, Albany)
 Hank Johnson (D-GA-4, Lithonia)
 Nikema Williams (D-GA-5, Atlanta)
 Lucy McBath (D-GA-7, Marietta)
 David Scott (D-GA-13, Atlanta)

Illinois
 Jonathan Jackson (D-IL-1, Chicago)
 Robin Kelly (D-IL-2, Matteson)
 Danny K. Davis (D-IL-7, Chicago)
 Lauren Underwood (D-IL-14, Naperville)

Indiana
 Andre Carson (D-IN-7, Indianapolis)

Louisiana
 Troy Carter (D-LA-2, New Orleans)

Maryland
 Glenn Ivey (D-MD-4, Cheverly)
 Kweisi Mfume (D-MD-7, Baltimore)

Massachusetts
 Ayanna Pressley (D-MA-7, Boston)

Minnesota
 Ilhan Omar (D-MN-5, Minneapolis)

Mississippi
 Bennie Thompson (D-MS-2, Bolton)

Missouri
 Cori Bush (D-MO-1, St. Louis)
 Emanuel Cleaver (D-MO-5, Kansas City)

Nevada
 Steven Horsford (D-NV-4, Las Vegas)

New Jersey
 Donald Payne Jr. (D-NJ-10, Newark)
 Bonnie Watson Coleman (D-NJ-12, Ewing Township)

New York
 Gregory Meeks (D-NY-5, Queens)
 Hakeem Jeffries (D-NY-8, Brooklyn)
 Yvette Clarke (D-NY-9, Brooklyn)
 Ritchie Torres (D-NY-15, Bronx)
 Jamaal Bowman (D-NY-16, Yonkers)

North Carolina
 Don Davis (D-NC-1, Snow Hill)
 Valerie Foushee (D-NC-4, Chapel Hill)
 Alma Adams (D-NC-12, Charlotte)

Ohio
 Joyce Beatty (D-OH-3, Columbus)
 Shontel Brown (D-OH-11, Warrensville Heights)
 Emilia Sykes (D-OH-13, Akron)

Pennsylvania
 Dwight Evans (D-PA-2, Philadelphia)
 Summer Lee (D-PA-12, Pittsburgh)

South Carolina
 Jim Clyburn (D-SC-6, Columbia)

Texas
 Al Green (D-TX-9, Houston)
 Sheila Jackson Lee (D-TX-18, Houston)
 Jasmine Crockett (D-TX-30, Dallas)
 Colin Allred (D-TX-32, Dallas)
 Marc Veasey (D-TX-33, Fort Worth)

Virginia
 Bobby Scott (D-VA-3, Newport News)
 Jennifer McClellan (D-VA-4, Richmond)

Washington
 Marilyn Strickland (D-WA-10, Tacoma)

Wisconsin
 Gwen Moore (D-WI-4, Milwaukee)

U.S. Virgin Islands
 Stacey Plaskett (D-VI-AL, St. Croix)

Source

Prominent former members

Presidents of the United States 

 Barack Obama (D-US), 44th President of the United States (2009–2017), United States Senator from Illinois (2005–2008), and Member of the Illinois Senate from the 13th district (1997–2004).

Vice presidents of the United States 

 Kamala Harris (D-US), 49th Vice President of the United States (2021–present), United States Senator from California (2017–2021), 32nd Attorney General of California (2011–2017), and 27th District Attorney of San Francisco (2004–2011).

United States Senate 

 Carol Moseley Braun (D-IL), United States Ambassador to New Zealand (1999–2001), United States Ambassador to Samoa (2000–2001), United States Senator from Illinois (1993–1999), Cook County Recorder of Deeds (1988–1999), and Member of the Illinois House of Representatives (1979–1988).
 Roland Burris (D-IL), United States Senator from Illinois (2009–2010), 39th Attorney General of Illinois (1991–1995), 3rd Comptroller of Illinois (1979–1991), and Director of the Illinois Department of Central Management Services (1973–1977).
 Mo Cowan (D-MA), United States Senator from Massachusetts (2013)

United States House of Representatives 

 Charles Rangel (D-NY), Member of the U.S. House of Representatives from New York (1971-2017), Chair of the House Ways and Means Committee (2007-2010), and Member of the New York State Assembly from the 72nd district (1967-1970).
 John Conyers (D-MI), Member of the U.S. House of Representatives from Michigan (1965-2017), Dean of the United States House of Representatives (2015-2017), Chair of the House Judiciary Committee (2007-2011), and Chair of the House Oversight Committee (1989-1995).
 Elijah Cummings (D-MD), Member of the U.S. House of Representatives from Maryland's 7th district (1996-2019), Chair of the House Oversight Committee (2019), and Member of the Maryland House of Delegates from the 39th district (1983-1996).
 John Lewis (D-GA), Member of the U.S. House of Representatives from Georgia's 5th district (1987–2020), Member of the Atlanta City Council from at-large post 18 (1982–1985), and 3rd Chairman of the Student Nonviolent Coordinating Committee (1963–1966)
 William Lacy Clay Jr. (D-MO), Member of the U.S. House of Representatives from Missouri's 1st district (2001–2021), Member of the Missouri Senate from the 4th district (1991–2001), and Member of the Missouri House of Representatives from the 59th district (1983–1991).
Cedric Richmond (D-LA), Director of the Office of Public Engagement (2021–present), Senior Advisor to the President (2021–present), Member of the U.S. House of Representatives from Louisiana's 2nd district (2011–2021), Chair of the Congressional Black Caucus (2017–2019), and Member of the Louisiana House of Representatives from the 101st district (2000–2011).
 Marcia Fudge (D-OH), Secretary of Housing and Urban Development (2021–present), Chair of the Congressional Black Caucus (2013–2015), Member of the U.S. House of Representatives from Ohio's 11th district (2008–2021), and Mayor of Warrensville Heights, Ohio (2000–2008).
 Alcee Hastings (D-FL), Member of the U.S. House of Representatives from Florida (1993-2021), and Judge of the United States District Court for the Southern District of Florida (1979-1989).

Congressional Caucus on Black Women and Girls 

The Congressional Caucus on Black Women and Girls is a separate caucus of the United States Congress founded in 2016 to advance issues and legislation important to the welfare of women and girls of African descent.

See also

 Congressional Black Caucus Foundation
 African Americans in the United States Congress
 Pan-African Congress

References

Bibliography

External links
 Congressional Black Caucus website
 Congressional Black Caucus Institute website
 Congressional Black Caucus Political Education & Leadership Institute
 Congressional Black Caucus Foundation
 A voice: African American Voices in Congress (Congressional Black Caucus online archive)

1969 establishments in the United States
Post–civil rights era in African-American history

 
Black Caucus
Politics and race in the United States